Ylläs, or Yllästunturi in Finnish, is a  high fell in the municipality of Kolari in Lapland Province of Finland. There are two villages near Ylläs: Äkäslompolo on the north side and Ylläsjärvi in the south. They are connected by an 11 km road, around the side of the fell. Both villages derive much of their income from tourism.

Ylläs is a popular cross country and downhill skiing centre. The area's marketing slogan is "Ylläs on ykkönen!" (Finnish for "Ylläs is number one!"). 
Ylläs is the second largest ski resort in Lapland, after Levi.
Many companies in the vicinity of Ylläs have taken the fell's name as part of their own, such as the Ylläksen Nousu sports club in Äkäslompolo.

Ylläs is the highest fell in Finland where you can find skiing lifts.

In the Ylläs area there are:
  cross-country skiing tracks,  of which are lit
 61 ski slopes
 29 ski lifts

Other fells near Ylläs are Kukastunturi, Lainiotunturi, Kuertunturi, Kesänki, Pyhätunturi and Aakenustunturi.

The nearest railway station is at Kolari and the nearest airport is Kittilä Airport.

Ylläs was the host of the thirteenth 1995 Winter Deaflympics.

Ylläs is also a popular tourist destination during the summer months with activities such as hiking, biking, fishing and canoeing all available for visitors to enjoy. The gondola is open during the summer season making it easy to reach the top of the fell and enjoy the panoramic views.

On the summit of Ylläs, there is a 126.2 metres tall guyed mast used for FM- and TV-broadcasting.

At Ylläs, there is a 2 kilometre long gondola lift, which is the tallest in Finland. One of the cabins of this lift can be used as sauna. It is the only sauna in a gondola lift cabin in the world .

External links

 Official page of Ylläs
 Ylläs Finland - Details and Information on Ylläs

Kolari
Mountains of Finland
Ski areas and resorts in Finland
Landforms of Lapland (Finland)
Tourist attractions in Lapland (Finland)